Monostichodus is a genus of fish in the family Distichodontidae found in tropical Africa.

Species
There are currently 3 recognized species in this genus:
 Monostichodus elongatus Vaillant, 1886 
 Monostichodus lootensi (Poll & Daget, 1968)
 Monostichodus mesmaekersi (Poll, 1959)

References

Distichodontidae
Fish of Africa
Taxa named by Léon Vaillant
Freshwater fish genera